The 1939 Idaho Vandals football team represented the University of Idaho in the 1939 college football season. The Vandals were led by fifth-year head coach Ted Bank, and were members of the Pacific Coast Conference. Home games were played on campus in Moscow at Neale Stadium, with one game in Boise at Public School Field.

The Vandals were  overall and lost all three conference games. They did not play any of the four California teams, Washington or Oregon. In the Battle of the Palouse with neighbor Washington State, the Vandals suffered a twelfth straight loss, falling  at Rogers Field in Pullman on November 11. Idaho's most recent win in the series was a fourteen years earlier in 1925 and the next was fifteen years away  in 1954.

Two weeks earlier, Idaho began a rare three-year losing streak to Montana in the Little Brown Stein rivalry with a 13-point shutout at homecoming in Moscow. While Montana was in the PCC (through 1949), the loser of the game was frequently last in the conference standings.

Schedule

 One game was played on Friday (Gonzaga at Spokane)and one on Thursday (at Denver on Thanksgiving)

All-conference
No Vandals were named to the All-Coast team; honorable mention were ends Ray Smith and Emory Howard, guard Tony Kamelevicz, and center Tony Aschenbrenner.

References

External links
Gem of the Mountains: 1940 University of Idaho yearbook – 1939 football season
Go Mighty Vandals – 1939 football season
Official game program: Idaho at Washington State –  November 11, 1939
WSU Libraries: Game video – Idaho at Washington State – November 11, 1939
Idaho Argonaut – student newspaper – 1939 editions

Idaho
Idaho Vandals football seasons
Idaho Vandals football